The 1997 Rexona Cup - Singles was a tennis event played on outdoor clay courts at the Am Rothenbaum in Hamburg, Germany. The 1997 Rexona Cup tournament was held from April 28 through May 4, 1997, and was part of Tier II of the 1997 WTA Tour.

Arantxa Sánchez Vicario and Brenda Schultz-McCarthy were the defending champions but they competed with different partners that year, Sánchez Vicario with Inés Gorrochategui and Schultz-McCarthy with Larisa Savchenko.

Savchenko and Schultz-McCarthy lost in the first round to Ruxandra Dragomir and Iva Majoli. Gorrochategui and Sánchez Vicario lost in the quarterfinals to Dragomir and Majoli. Anke Huber and Mary Pierce won in the final 2–6, 7–6, 6–2 against Dragomir and Majoli.

Seeds
Champion seeds are indicated in bold text while text in italics indicates the round in which those seeds were eliminated.

 Larisa Savchenko /  Brenda Schultz-McCarthy (first round)
 Gigi Fernández /  Conchita Martínez (semifinals)
 Sandrine Testud /  Caroline Vis (quarterfinals)
 Olga Lugina /  Elena Wagner (quarterfinals)

Draw

External links
 ITF tournament edition details

1997 WTA Tour